Khaledabad (also Romanized as Khāledābād; also known as Kholdābād) is a village in Darian Rural District, in the Central District of Shiraz County, Fars Province, Iran. At the 2006 census, its population was 44, in 18 families.

References 

Populated places in Shiraz County